Åsen is a former municipality in the old Nord-Trøndelag county, Norway. The  municipality existed from 1838 until its dissolution in 1962. The municipality was located to the southwest part of what is now Levanger municipality in Trøndelag county, roughly bordered in the north by the lakes Hammervatnet and Hoklingen, and by the Åsenfjorden to the west. The administrative centre was the village of Åsen.

History

The municipality of Aasen was established on 1 January 1838 (see formannskapsdistrikt law). The spelling was later changed to Åsen. During the 1960s, there were many municipal mergers across Norway due to the work of the Schei Committee. On 1 January 1962, the town of Levanger (population: 1,669) was merged with the neighboring municipalities of Frol (population: 3,774), Åsen (population: 1,939), and Skogn (population: 4,756) to form a new, larger municipality called Levanger.

Name
The municipality (originally the parish) is named after the local fjord, Åsenfjorden. The name is identical to the Norwegian word  which means "the hill". Prior to the 1917 Norwegian language reform law, the name was spelled with the digraph "Aa" (as Aasen), and after this reform, the letter Å was used instead.

Government
While it existed, this municipality was responsible for primary education (through 10th grade), outpatient health services, senior citizen services, unemployment, social services, zoning, economic development, and municipal roads. During its existence, this municipality was governed by a municipal council of elected representatives, which in turn elected a mayor.

Municipal council
The municipal council  of Åsen was made up of 17 representatives that were elected to four year terms. The party breakdown of the final municipal council was as follows:

Mayors
The mayors of Åsen:

 1838–1839: Jonas Jonsen Nes
 1839-1839: Erik Mikalsen Skjelstad 
 1840–1843: Peder Ellevsen Berg 
 1844–1845: Ole Tørrissen Vedul
 1846–1847: Peder Steffensen Nonstad
 1848–1859: Peder Olsen
 1860–1866: Christian Bye
 1867–1869: Ole Island
 1870–1873: Henrik Reinaas
 1874–1879: John Stavnaas
 1880–1889: Peder O. Mæhre (V)
 1890–1891: Arn Solem Bye (V)
 1892–1919: Ole Martin Augdahl (V)
 1920–1922: Anders Todal (V)
 1923–1925: John Wold (Bp)
 1926–1931: Anders Todal (V)
 1932–1937: John Wold (Bp)
 1938–1941: Sigurd Aarnseth (V)
 1942–1943: Sigurd Lundby (NS)
 1944-1944: Ragnar Fiskvik (NS)
 1945-1945: Sigurd Aarnseth (V)
 1946–1947: Olaf Jensen (Ap)
 1948–1951: Fridtjov Mo (Bp)
 1952–1955: Olav Mo (Bp)
 1956–1957: Olaf Jensen (Ap)
 1958–1959: Ivar Jørum (Ap)
 1960–1961: Fridtjov Mo (Sp)

See also
List of former municipalities of Norway

References

Levanger
Former municipalities of Norway
1838 establishments in Norway
1962 disestablishments in Norway